Dockyard Road (station code:  DKRD) is a railway station on the Harbour Line of the Mumbai Suburban Railway. It is the stop closest to the Mazagon Dock Limited.

This station gives access to Mazagaon area. There is a sales tax office within a ten-minute walk from this station. Dockyard Road is a part of Mazagaon.

Attractions include the Joseph Baptista Gardens, Gaodevi Temple, Manakeshwar Temple and Bhaucha Dhakka (ferry wharf).

Mumbai Suburban Railway stations
Railway stations in Mumbai City district